The Stoll kidnapping was a 1934 crime in Louisville, Kentucky that made the front page of national newspapers and magazines as an FBI investigation under the Federal Kidnapping Act. In 2016, Louisville Magazine writer Brian Hunt called the Stoll kidnapping "Louisville's crime of the century." Alice Speed-Stoll, wife of oil company executive Berry V. Stoll, was kidnapped in October 1934 and held in Indianapolis for a $50,000 ransom by Thomas H. Robinson, Jr.

While the kidnapper's wife was apprehended by the FBI almost immediately, Robinson was not arrested until May 11, 1936, when he was taken at gunpoint in Glendale, California by FBI agents including John Bugas.  Robinson was convicted, served time in prison, was retried and sentenced to death, had his death sentence commuted by President Harry S. Truman, and escaped prison multiple times before he was finally released in 1970.

References

Kidnappings in the United States
Crimes in Indiana
1934 in Indiana